The Lusitanian cownose ray (Rhinoptera marginata) is a species of eagle ray found along the western coast of Africa and Mediterranean Sea. It is apparently very rare in the Mediterranean Sea, but is common in shallow waters off the western Africa.

Description

Distribution
It is found in the eastern Atlantic from Portugal to the Central African coast and in the eastern part of the Mediterranean Sea.

Life cycle
They exhibit ovoviviparity (aplacental viviparity), with embryos feeding initially on yolk, then receiving additional nourishment from the mother by indirect absorption of uterine fluid enriched with mucus, fat or protein through specialised structures.

References

Lusitanian cownose ray
Fish of the Mediterranean Sea
Marine fauna of North Africa
Lusitanian cownose ray